Chad Beguelin (born September 24, 1969) is an American playwright and lyricist. He wrote the lyrics and co-wrote the book for The Prom. He also wrote the book for Disney's Aladdin, as well as additional lyrics for the score. He was nominated for Best Original Book and Best Original Score for Aladdin. He is also known for his collaborations with composer Matthew Sklar, having written the lyrics and co-written the book for the Broadway musical The Wedding Singer and the lyrics for the Broadway musical Elf the Musical. Beguelin was nominated for two Tony Awards for his work on The Wedding Singer, as well as a Drama Desk Award for Outstanding Lyrics.

Biography
Beguelin, a native of Centralia, Illinois, received an MFA from the graduate writing program at New York University's Tisch School of the Arts.

Beguelin wrote the book and lyrics for The Rhythm Club which was produced at the Signature Theatre, Arlington, Virginia in 2000 and was nominated for a Helen Hayes Award. He wrote the book and lyrics for Wicked City, which was produced at the American Stage Company and the Mason Street Warehouse, Saugatuck, Michigan, in 2004. He wrote the books for Disney's Aladdin and On the Record.

As a screenwriter, Beguelin sold a script to Grammnet Productions and also worked as a staff writer for Disney's live action film department in California.

Casey Nicholaw directed and choreographed the stage musical Aladdin which ran at the 5th Avenue Theatre, Seattle, Washington, July 7–31, 2011. The musical uses songs from the 1992 film Aladdin, with a new book by Beguelin and new lyrics by Beguelin and Alan Menken. The musical opened on Broadway on March 20, 2014 at the New Amsterdam Theatre.

Beguelin made his Off-Broadway playwrighting debut with Harbor, directed by Mark Lamos, presented by Primary Stages, from August 6, 2013 to September 8, 2013. Harbor had its world premiere at the Westport Country Playhouse, Westport, Connecticut, from August 2012 to September 15, 2012, directed by Mark Lamos.

Beguelin and Bob Martin wrote the book for a new musical based on the film Gotta Dance, titled Half Time, with music by Matthew Sklar and lyrics by Nell Benjamin, with additional music by Marvin Hamlisch. Directed and choreographed by Jerry Mitchell, the musical premiered at the Bank of America Theatre in Chicago on December 13, 2015, running through January 17, 2016. It had originally been expected to open on Broadway in the Fall of 2016, and then for the Spring of 2017. The musical instead opened at the Paper Mill Playhouse, Millburn, New Jersey on May 31, 2018. The cast stars André De Shields, Georgia Engel, Donna McKechnie, and Lillias White.

He wrote the book with Bob Martin and lyrics for a new musical The Prom, with music by Matthew Sklar based on an original concept by Jack Viertel. The musical premiered at the Alliance Theatre, Atlanta, Georgia on August 18, 2016 in previews, directed by Casey Nicholaw. The musical opened on Broadway at the Longacre Theatre on November 15, 2018, with previews starting on October 23, 2018.

Awards and honors
He has received six Tony Award nominations: 2019 Best Book of a Musical and Best Original Score for The Prom; 2014 Best Book of a Musical and Best Original Score Written for the Theatre for Aladdin; 2006 Best Book of a Musical and Best Original Score for The Wedding Singer.

He received three Drama Desk Award nominations: 2014 Outstanding Book of a Musical and Outstanding Lyrics for Aladdin; 2006 Drama Desk Award Outstanding Lyrics for The Wedding Singer.

Beguelin has received the Jonathan Larson Performing Arts Foundation Award, the Gilman & Gonzalez-Falla Theatre Foundation Award, and the Edward Kleban Award for Outstanding Lyric Writing. He was named to the Centralia High School Distinguished Alumni Hall of Fame in November 2016.

Personal life
Beguelin currently lives in Manhattan and Bridgehampton with his husband Tom and their dog Tucker.

References

External links
 
 
 The Wedding Singer's Homepage
 
 Interview and Rehearsal Video from Broadway.com
 

1969 births
Living people
20th-century American dramatists and playwrights
American male screenwriters
Tisch School of the Arts alumni
Writers from New York City
American LGBT songwriters
Place of birth missing (living people)
American LGBT dramatists and playwrights
LGBT people from Illinois
American LGBT screenwriters
American male dramatists and playwrights
American musical theatre lyricists
Broadway composers and lyricists
Screenwriters from New York (state)
Songwriters from New York (state)
20th-century American male writers